Ogryzko is a Russian last name, a variant of Ogryzkov. The following people bear this last name:
Tatiana Ogrizko (Tatyana Ogryzko) (b. 1976), Belarusian Olympic rhythmic gymnast
Vasily Ogryzko, scientist with the first publication on the alternative theories of quantum evolution

References

Notes

Sources
И. М. Ганжина (I. M. Ganzhina). "Словарь современных русских фамилий" (Dictionary of Modern Russian Last Names). Москва, 2001. 

Russian-language surnames
